Elections to Watford Borough Council were held on 4 May 2006. One third of the council was up for election and the Liberal Democrat party kept overall control of the council. At the same time in the election for Watford's directly elected mayor the Liberal Democrat Dorothy Thornhill was re-elected.

After the election, the composition of the council was:
Liberal Democrat 28
Green 3
Conservative 3
Labour 1

Mayoral election

2006

Council election result

Ward results

References

2006 Watford election result
Election results - Mayoral 4 May 2006
Election results - Borough 4 May 2006

2006 English local elections
2006
2000s in Hertfordshire